"Guinnevere" is a song written by David Crosby in  1968. The song appears on Crosby, Stills & Nash's critically acclaimed eponymous debut album. The song is notable for its serene yet pointed melody and its unique lyrics, which compare Queen Guinevere to the object of the singer's affection, referred to as "m'lady".

Composition
In a Rolling Stone interview, Crosby remarked: "That is a very unusual song, it's in a very strange tuning (EBDGAD) with strange time signatures. It's about three women that I loved. One of whom was Christine Hinton - the girl who got killed who was my girlfriend - and one of whom was Joni Mitchell, and the other one is somebody that I can't tell. It might be my best song."

According to Robert Christgau, the song was based on a three-note motif from the 1960 Miles Davis album Sketches of Spain.

The album CSN (box set) contains a demo version of the song played by Crosby on guitar, Jack Casady of Jefferson Airplane on bass, and Cyrus Faryar of Modern Folk Quartet on bouzouki. In the liner notes, Crosby says of the song: "When all my friends were listening to Elvis and 1950s rock 'n' roll, I was listening to Chet Baker, Gerry Mulligan and West Coast jazz. Later I got involved with the folk music scene. After getting kicked out of the Byrds I didn't have a plan, but I went back to my roots, and "Guinnevere" is a combination of these two influences."

Lyrical themes
The song also deals with the importance of freedom. It may have been written about Queen Guinevere from the perspective of a man addressing a woman; it has been speculated that Crosby wrote about her from the perspective of Sir Lancelot of ancient Welsh lore. "Guinnevere" could also be referring to Nancy Ross, who lived with David Crosby and (according to author David McGowan) drew pentagrams on the wall. She would leave Crosby in 1966 for Gram Parsons, the grandson of a citrus fruit magnate. These facts correlate to the "Nancy Ross" theory: in the song, Crosby sings that Guinnevere "drew pentagrams," and that "peacocks wandered aimlessly underneath an orange tree."

Personnel
David Crosby: lead vocals, guitars
Graham Nash: lead vocals

Cover versions
Miles Davis recorded a version of the song during a January 27, 1970 session.  It was first released, in edited form, on the 1979 compilation Circle in the Round, with a longer version appearing on the 1998 release of The Complete Bitches Brew Sessions. According to David Crosby's 2016 podcast interview with Marc Maron, Davis played it for Crosby at the former's home before releasing it.  Crosby did not recognize any resemblance between Davis' version and his composition and Davis kicked him out of his house. In late 2017, Crosby tweeted that he changed his mind about Miles' recording: "Finally ....after so many years of not getting it ....I listened to Miles and his band doing Guinnevere....and got it..."

References

External links
 https://archive.today/20150411003043/http://www.davesweb.cnchost.com/nwsltr105.html

Crosby, Stills, Nash & Young songs
1969 songs
Songs written by David Crosby